Arthur Roy Cruttenden (18 February 1925 – 3 June 2019) was a British long jumper.

Athletics career
Born in Brighton, he competed in the 1956 Summer Olympics.

He represented England in the long jump at the 1958 British Empire and Commonwealth Games in Cardiff, Wales, where he finished in fifth place overall.

References

1925 births
2019 deaths
Sportspeople from Brighton
Olympic athletes of Great Britain
Athletes (track and field) at the 1956 Summer Olympics
English male long jumpers
Commonwealth Games competitors for England
Athletes (track and field) at the 1958 British Empire and Commonwealth Games